Changrui is a given name of Chinese origin. It may refer to:

Xue Changrui (born 1991), Chinese pole vaulter
Huang Changrui, Chinese swimmer and 2006 Asian Swimming Championships medalist
Changrui, male lead character in 2009 film Sophie's Revenge
Changrui Mountain, landform near the Eastern Qing Tombs

Chinese masculine given names